Chereshovo (Bulgarian: Черешово) is a village in northern Bulgaria. It is located in the municipality of Slivo Pole in Rousse.

As of March 2015 the village has a population of 153.

External links
 Transportation Chereshovo, Ruse Province

Villages in Ruse Province